Sagrado Corazón station is a rapid transit station in San Juan, Puerto Rico. Located the Martín Peña neighborhood at the southern edge of Santurce. The station is named after the district and the university of the same name. Opening on December 17, 2004, this is the northern terminus of the Tren Urbano line. The station features a stained glass display of public art display entitled Vitral by Luis Hernández Cruz.

Nearby
 Sagrado Corazón University
 Sagrado Corazón and Monteflores historic zone 
 San Juan YMCA

Bus terminal 

Bus terminal is located at the south entrance of the station:

E10 express route: Sagrado Corazón – Old San Juan Covadonga Terminal
T2: Sagrado Corazón – Hato Rey – Plaza Las Américas – Hiram Bithorn Stadium – Roberto Clemente Coliseum – San Patricio – Caparra – Bayamón Station
T3: Sagrado Corazón – Santurce – Miramar – Old San Juan Covadonga Terminal
T9: Old San Juan Covadonga Terminal – Miramar – Santurce – Sagrado Corazón – Barrio Obrero – Hato Rey (through Barbosa Ave.) – Río Piedras – Cupey Station
T21: Sagrado Corazón – Santurce – Museum of Art of Puerto Rico – Condado – Old San Juan Covadonga Terminal
C1: Sagrado Corazón – Hato Rey (through Ponce de León Ave. & PR-1) – Río Piedras
C22: Sagrado Corazón – Hato Rey – Plaza Las Américas – Hiram Bithorn Stadium – Roberto Clemente Coliseum
C35: Sagrado Corazón – Central Park – Puerto Rico Convention Center
C36: Sagrado Corazón – Residencial Luis Lloréns Torres – Punta Las Marías
D15: Sagrado Corazón – Hato Rey – Residencial Manuel A. Pérez – Río Piedras – Cupey Station
D45: Sagrado Corazón – Isla Verde – Piñones – Loíza

Gallery

See also 
 List of Tren Urbano stations
 Tren Urbano Phase 1A

References

External links

Tren Urbano stations
Railway stations in the United States opened in 2004
2004 establishments in Puerto Rico